The first season of the television sitcom Brooklyn Nine-Nine premiered September 17, 2013 on Fox and concluded March 25, 2014 with 22 episodes. The season stars Andy Samberg as childish but skilled detective Jake Peralta.

Summary
Raymond Holt becomes the captain of the NYPD's fictional 99th precinct and almost immediately clashes with Jake Peralta as he is childish but a great detective, who's as immature as he is skilled at solving crimes. In other events, the precinct's annual Halloween heist bet is established, Charles Boyle is shot in the butt while protecting partner Detective Rosa Diaz from a criminal with a grudge against Holt, the squad gets a glimpse into Holt's home life at a party thrown by him and his husband Kevin, Charles begins a relationship with a woman, Vivian, that ends when their engagement is called off and Jake develops feelings for his partner, fellow detective Amy Santiago after winning a bet against her, that sees them go on a fake date and have a great time. Amy begins dating Teddy, a cop whom she knew from earlier, much to Jake's jealousy. The season ends with Jake going undercover.

Cast

Main
 Andy Samberg as Detective Jake Peralta
 Stephanie Beatriz as Detective Rosa Diaz
 Terry Crews as Sergeant Terry Jeffords
 Melissa Fumero as Detective Amy Santiago
 Joe Lo Truglio as Detective Charles Boyle
 Chelsea Peretti as Gina Linetti
 Andre Braugher as Captain Raymond Holt

Recurring
 Dirk Blocker as Detective Michael Hitchcock
 Joel McKinnon Miller as Detective Norm Scully
 Marilu Henner as Vivian Ludley

Guest
 Pete Davidson as Steven
 Mary Elizabeth Ellis as Dr. Rossi
 Dean Winters as Detective Keith "The Vulture" Pembroke
 Patton Oswalt as Fire Marshall Boone
 Craig Robinson as Doug Judy
 Marc Evan Jackson as Kevin Cozner
 Kyle Bornheimer as Detective Teddy Wells
 James M. Connor as Deputy Commissioner Podolski
 Andy Richter as Doorman
 Jerry Minor as Jerry Grundhaven
 Joey Diaz as Sal
 Michael G. Hagerty as Captain McGinley
 Fred Armisen as Mlep(clay)nos
 Stacy Keach as Jimmy Brogan
 Kid Cudi as Dustin Whitman
 Adam Sandler as himself
 Joe Theismann as himself

Episodes

Reception

Critical response
The first season received mostly positive reviews, with many praising the cast, setting, and humor, although the Boyle-Rosa plot throughout the season was criticized. The review aggregator website Rotten Tomatoes reports an 89% approval rating, with an average score of 7.32/10, based on 57 reviews. The website's consensus reads, "Led by the surprisingly effective pairing of Andy Samberg and Andre Braugher, Brooklyn Nine-Nine is a charming, intelligently written take on the cop show format." Metacritic gave the first season of the show a weighted average rating of 70/100 based on 33 reviews, indicating "generally favorable reviews".

Awards and nominations

References

External links
  at Fox
 

 
2013 American television seasons
2014 American television seasons
Brooklyn Nine-Nine